Ladysbridge, known for census purposes as Knockglass, is a village in County Cork, Ireland. As of the 2016 census, the area had a population of 658 people.

Ladysbridge, sometimes spelled Lady's Bridge, is also connected to Castlemartyr via a way-marked nature trail. This walking route crosses the nearby Womanagh River on a pedestrian bridge.

Within the village itself, a number of buildings date from the 19th century, including the former national school (dated 1891) and Ladysbridge Roman Catholic church (dated to c.1820). This church, which is dedicated to Saint Mary, is in the parish of Ballymacoda and Ladysbridge and the Roman Catholic Diocese of Cloyne. The local GAA club, Fr. O'Neill's GAA, represents the same parish area. 

A monument in the centre of the village commemorates the Manchester Martyrs, one of whom was from the Ladysbridge area.

References

Townlands of County Cork
Towns and villages in County Cork